The Tetrahedron Computer Methodology was a short lived journal that was published by Pergamon Press (now Elsevier) to experiment with electronic submission of articles in the ChemText format, and the sharing source code to enable reproducibility. It was the first chemical journal to be published electronically, with issues distributed in print and on floppy disks. It is likely it was also the first journal to accept submissions in a non-paper format (on floppy disks). The journal ceased publication owing to technical and non-technical reasons, and may have lacked sufficient institutional support. The last issue appeared in 1992 but was dated 1990.

References

External links

Computer science journals
Cheminformatics
Chemistry journals
Publications established in 1988
English-language journals
Elsevier academic journals
Publications disestablished in 1990